Ashland Cemetery is a cemetery in Ashland, Oregon, in the United States. It is listed on the National Register of Historic Places. Notable burials include Lindsay Applegate and Abel Helman.

See also

 National Register of Historic Places listings in Jackson County, Oregon

References

External links
 City of Ashland – Cemetery Search
 
 

Buildings and structures in Ashland, Oregon
Cemeteries on the National Register of Historic Places in Oregon
National Register of Historic Places in Jackson County, Oregon